The 1988 Brownlow Medal was the 61st year the award was presented to the player adjudged the fairest and best player during the Victorian Football League (VFL) home and away season. Gerard Healy of the Sydney Swans won the medal by polling twenty votes during the 1988 VFL season.

Leading votegetters 

* The player was ineligible to win the medal due to suspension by the VFL Tribunal during the year.

References 

Brownlow Medal
1988